Danny Bridge (born 4 January 1993) is an Ireland international rugby league footballer who plays for Oldham in Betfred League 1.

Background
Bridge was born in Oldham, Greater Manchester, England.

He is the younger brother of Chris Bridge.

He was suspended from playing in 2020 after testing positive for cocaine, however it was reported on 14 Jan 2021 that his ban had been reduced due to a WADA rule change.

Club career
Bridge started his career at Waterhead before joining Wigan Warriors in 2009. He played for the club's academy sides, but left the club in July 2011 when he was signed by Warrington Wolves for an undisclosed fee.

Loan at Bradford
Bridge was loaned to the Bradford Bulls at the start of the 2014 season for a month. He re-signed for another month once his current loan deal expired. During April he signed on a season long loan for Bradford.

He featured in Round 1 (Castleford Tigers) to Round 7 (Widnes Vikings). Bridge then featured in Round 9 (Leeds Rhinos).

On 23 April, Bridge was 'recalled' back to his home-town club Warrington.

International career
Bridge represented England at under-15 and under-18 level. He was part of the Ireland squad at the 2013 Rugby League World Cup.

Bridge represented Ireland at the 2015 European Cup.

In 2016 he was called up to the Ireland squad for the 2017 Rugby League World Cup European Pool B qualifiers.

References

External links
Oldham profile

1993 births
Living people
Bradford Bulls players
Doping cases in rugby league
English people of Irish descent
English rugby league players
Featherstone Rovers players
Ireland national rugby league team players
Oldham R.L.F.C. players
Rochdale Hornets players
Rugby league players from Oldham
Rugby league second-rows
Swinton Lions players
Warrington Wolves players